Kim Kyoung-soo (born 1 December 1967) is a South Korean politician who served as a member of the National Assembly of South Korea from 2016 to 2018, and as Governor of South Gyeongsang Province from 2018 to 2021, until he was convicted and arrested for opinion rigging.

Early life 
Born in Goseong of Gyeongsang Province, Kim spent his adolescence in Jinju. He enrolled in Seoul National University in the department of anthropology.
Under the Roh Tae-woo government, Kim was sentenced to two years in prison for participating in the democracy movement, but was later released.

Political career 
Kim started his political career aiding lawmaker Shin Kye-ryun in 1994. In 2002, he joined the election camp of then-presidential candidate Roh Moo-hyun. After the president's suicide, Kim became the Democratic Party district chairman of Gimhae. He was elected  district lawmaker in 2016 South Korean legislative election. He married a member of the younger generation who also graduated from Seoul National University, from Gwangju, a left-leaning area of South Korea. Kim is considered to be part of the pro-Roh group, along with the former president Moon Jae-in and former South Chungcheong governor Ahn Hee-jung.

In 2018, Kim was Democratic Party candidate for Governor of South Gyeongsang Province in the 2018 South Korean local elections. Kim narrowly won the election against conservative foe Kim Tae-Ho of the Liberty Korea Party. Despite his victory, Kim was suspected to have been heavily involved in the opinion rigging scandal.

In 2019, Kim was jailed for two years on charges of online-rigging operations of both the first and second order. In 21 July 2021, he was sentenced to two years by the supreme court for computer business obstruction, and eventually lost his position as governor.

References

Governors of South Gyeongsang Province
1967 births
Living people
Members of the National Assembly (South Korea)
Minjoo Party of Korea politicians
Seoul National University alumni
People from South Gyeongsang Province
Kyoung-soo
South Korean politicians convicted of crimes